Harry Charles Moore (May 5, 1941 – May 16, 1997) was an American convicted murderer who was executed in Oregon for the 1992 murders of Thomas Lauri and Barbara Cunningham. He was the second person executed by the state of Oregon since 1978 and remains the state's most recent execution.

Murders
Harry Charles Moore had been married to two of his nieces. Moore shot Thomas Lauri four times in the face with a 9 mm pistol in front of a Salem post office. Moore then drove to Cunningham's house and shot her in the abdomen. He then fired three more rounds into her head. Cunningham was Moore's half-sister and Lauri was her former husband. Moore said he had killed them because he thought they would move to Las Vegas with his estranged wife and baby daughter, and expose them to a life of prostitution and drugs.

Sentencing and execution
Moore was sentenced to death on July 20, 1993. He later threatened to sue anyone who tried to stop his execution. He also appealed to the Oregon Supreme Court to drop the automatic appeal of his sentence. Moore's last meal consisted of two green apples, two red apples, a tray of fresh fruit, and two 2-liter bottles of Coke.

Just prior to the execution Moore asked the warden if he could borrow the keys to the prison, promising to "bring them right back." The request was denied. As Moore lay dying, he whispered: "I want the last word I say to be Jennifer, J-e-n-n-i-f-e-r." Jennifer is the name of Moore's daughter by his niece Cindy Moore. He had a son prior to Jennifer, and another son after Jennifer.

Moore was executed by lethal injection on May 16, 1997. He remains the second of only two people to be executed in Oregon since the resumption of the death penalty. The other was convicted serial killer Douglas Franklin Wright in 1996. Both waived their appeals and asked that the execution be carried out.

See also
 Capital punishment in Oregon
 Capital punishment in the United States
 List of most recent executions by jurisdiction

References

1941 births
1997 deaths
20th-century executions by Oregon
20th-century executions of American people
American male criminals
American people convicted of murder
American people executed for murder
Executed people from Oregon
People convicted of murder by Oregon
People executed by Oregon by lethal injection
People from Salem, Oregon